Alan Fox may refer to:
 Alan Fox (sociologist) (1920–2002), English industrial sociologist
 Alan Fox (footballer) (1936–2021), Welsh professional footballer
 Alan C. Fox (born 1944), author and founder of the Rattle poetry journal

See also
 Allen Fox (born 1939), former tennis player